Mi Forma De Sentir (My way of feeling) is an album by Mexican recording artist Pedro Fernández, released by Universal Music Latino on November 11, 1994.

Fernandez became a full-grown romantic balladeer on this 1995 set. While his roots are in ranchera and mariachi, he has no problem making modern sounding albums: The hit title track is a traditionally styled ballad, but with synthesizers instead of accordions. Featured here is a rare vocal in English: Willie Nelson's "Crazy" is done with the original lyric, and then again in Spanish as "Loco." His vocal is equally emotive on each, and he even tops Engelbert Humperdinck's crooning on "Release Me."

"Mi Forma De Sentir", earned him international fame by reaching Platinum in Mexico and Double Platinum in the United States, Venezuela and Chile, among others. "Si Te Vas" would go on to win Pedro two BMI awards. Two years later, in 1996, he presented his album "Deseos Y Delirios", which includes recognized songs like "Si tu supieras", "Mi forma de sentir" and "El sinaloense". That album sold more than 300 thousand copies.

Track listing

References

External links
 Pedro Fernandez – Official Website
 Pedro Fernández Music

1994 albums
Pedro Fernández (singer) albums